Bithynia walkeri is a species of freshwater snail with a gill and an operculum, an aquatic gastropod mollusk in the family Bithyniidae. It is only known from two artificial reservoirs in Suphan Buri Province.

Distribution 
The distribution of this species includes:
 Thailand

References

External links 

Bithyniidae
Gastropods described in 1968